Andrea Ivan (born 9 January 1973) is an Italian association football coach and former player who used to play as goalkeeper. He works as a goalkeeping coach for Sporting Arno, an amateur football club of Florence.

Career

Early career
Born in Florence, Ivan started his professional career at home region Tuscany, for Poggibonsi at Serie C2. He became the regular starter in the 2nd season, played all 34 matches. In mid-1994, he was signed by Ascoli of Serie B, where he worked as Marco Bizzarri's backup. He then back to Tuscany for A.C. Siena, by-then at Serie C1, played 59 matches in 2 seasons.

Salernitana
At the start of 1997–98 season, he joined Foggia, but in November to Salernitana, as Daniele Balli's backup. In 1999–2000 season, Salernitana signed Fabrizio Lorieri and Lorenzo Squizzi to replace the left for Balli, made him became 1 of the 5 goalkeepers, along with youth products Rosario Niosi and Crescenzo De Vito.

Livorno & Fiorentina
In January 2000, he left for Livorno, by-then at Serie C1. At Livorno, he quickly became first choice, ahead of Silvio Lafuenti. In mid-2002, he left for hometown club, newly found Serie C2 team Florentia Viola, which AC Fiorentina went bankrupt (And Livorno and Fiorentina became regional rival in Serie A due to both team from Tuscany). He played all 34 league matches and La viola was the fewest goals concerned team. After Fiorentina was invited to play Serie B in 2003–04 season, Ivan became backup again, behind Sebastián Cejas.

Pescara & Atalanta
The team promoted beck to Serie A at the end of season, and Ivan left for Pescara of Serie B, where he played 25 league matches and his backup Pierluigi Brivio played 15 matches.

In mid-2005, he worked for Atalanta, as Alex Calderoni and Ferdinando Coppola's backup.

Amateur Football
In January 2009, he left for Mapello of Eccellenza Lombardy (Italian 6th level).

In July 2009, he left for UD Ibiza-Eivissa at Regional de Ibiza y Formentera (Spanish fifth level, regional league). After the cancellation of the club, he returned in Italy to play with Prima Categoria amateurs Castelfranco Stella Rossa.

Honours
Salernitana
Serie B: 1998–99

Livorno
Serie C1: 2001–02

Fiorentina
Serie C1: 2002–03

Atalanta
Serie B: 2005–06

References

External links
 Profile at La Gazzetta dello Sport 

Italian footballers
Italian expatriate footballers
Serie A players
Serie B players
Serie C players
Ascoli Calcio 1898 F.C. players
A.C.N. Siena 1904 players
Calcio Foggia 1920 players
U.S. Salernitana 1919 players
U.S. Livorno 1915 players
ACF Fiorentina players
Delfino Pescara 1936 players
Atalanta B.C. players
Association football goalkeepers
Expatriate footballers in Spain
Italian expatriate sportspeople in Spain
Footballers from Florence
1973 births
Living people
Scandicci Calcio players